Tepe is a village in Gülnar district of  Mersin Province, Turkey. At  it is situated in the  Toros Mountains. The name of the village tepe means hill and it refers to a hill to the south of the village . The population of the village was 109 in 2012.

References

Villages in Gülnar District